Andrew E. Johnson (born January 12, 1953) served as a Democrat from District 19 from 1979 to 1982 in the Florida House of Representatives.

He is known as a staunch opponent of capital punishment and was a witness at the 1979 execution of John Spenkelink in the electric chair at Florida State Prison. Spenkelink was the second person to be executed, and first against his will, after the Supreme Court of the United States reinstated capital punishment with its 1976 ruling Gregg v. Georgia and companion cases Proffitt v. Florida and Jurek v. Texas.

References

Members of the Florida House of Representatives
Living people
1953 births